Rayed Abdullah Salem Al Harbi (1988 – 18 October 2009) was a citizen of Saudi Arabia who was named on Saudi Arabia's list of most wanted terrorist suspects.
He was discovered with Yussef al-Shiri at Jizan, near Saudi Arabia's border with Yemen, while disguised in women's clothing, and wearing suicide vests, on 18 October 2009.

Criminal biography
The two men died in a shootout, as did a Saudi policeman, when a Saudi policewoman was going to search the two "women".
A second policeman was injured.
A third man, who has not been identified, and who was not in disguise, was driving with them, was captured.
His interrogation led to the capture of six Yemeni accomplices.
The men were reported to have been members in Al Qaida in the Arabian Peninsula.
In addition to the suicide vests they were wearing their vehicle had a third completed suicide belt, and a fourth that had not yet been fully assembled.

The individual who rented the truck remains at large.

References

1988 births
2009 deaths
Fugitives
Fugitives wanted by Saudi Arabia
Named on Saudi Arabia's list of most wanted suspected terrorists
Saudi Arabian al-Qaeda members